The photoreceptor cell-specific nuclear receptor (PNR), also known as NR2E3 (nuclear receptor subfamily 2, group E, member 3), is a protein that in humans is encoded by the NR2E3 gene. PNR is a member of the nuclear receptor super family of intracellular transcription factors.

Function 

PNR is exclusively expressed in the retina.  The main target genes of PNR are rhodopsin and several opsins which are essential for sight.

Structure and ligands 
The crystal structure of PNR's ligand-binding domain is known. It self-dimerizes into, by default, a repressor state. Computer simulations based on this model shows that a ligand could possibly fit into PNR and switch it into a transcription activator. 13-cis retinoic acid is a known weak agonist that fits into such a pocket, but no physiologic ligand is known. Two synthetic compounds, 11A and 11B, appear to be agonists but do not go into the pocket and instead work as allosteric modulators. A more recent screening identifies another compound called photoregulin-1 (PR1) that functions as a reverse agonist, an activity possibly useful in the management of retinitis pigmentosa.

Clinical significance 

Mutations in the NR2E3 gene have been linked to several inherited retinal diseases, including enhanced S-cone syndrome (ESCS), a form of retinitis pigmentosa, and  Goldmann-Favre syndrome.

References

Further reading

External links 
 
 
 
 

Intracellular receptors
Transcription factors